The Theatre Royal Wakefield is a theatre in Wakefield, England, which dates back to 1894. The theatre was originally known as the Theatre Royal and Opera House and dates back to the 1770s.

Today's theatre was designed in 1894 as the  Wakefield Opera House, by theatre architect Frank Matcham, and was built for a price of £13,000. The Theatre Royal Wakefield is the smallest remaining of Matcham's theatres.

In the 1920s the theatre had to compete against cinemas and in the summer live shows were replaced by films. In 1954 the theatre closed and became a picture house, and a few years later, a bingo hall. However, in 1981 it reopened as the Wakefield Theatre Royal under chairman Sir Rodney Walker. Support was given to revitalise the theatre from city leaders and music and drama amateurs and professionals.

Theatre Royal Wakefield operates as both a producing and a receiving house. In 2011 British playwright John Godber joined the Theatre as Creative Director, and the Theatre now plays a producing role for The John Godber Company.

Theatre Royal Wakefield works with young people, with its Performance Academy operating across two sites in Wakefield and Pontefract. It runs dance, music and drama training for children aged from 5 to 18, as well as its youth company, Wakefield Youth Music Theatre.

In 2012 the Theatre applied for funding from the Heritage Lottery Fund for a £2.6 million project to restore the theatre building.

See also
Listed buildings in Wakefield
Theatre Royal (disambiguation)

References

External links

Theatre Royal Wakefield

Theatres in West Yorkshire
Grade II* listed theatres
Culture in Wakefield
Listed buildings in Wakefield